Anton Olegovich Sagadeyev (born 6 September 1993) is a Kazakhstani ice hockey player for Barys Astana in the Kontinental Hockey League (KHL) and the Kazakhstani national team.

He represented Kazakhstan at the 2021 IIHF World Championship.

References

External links

1993 births
Living people
Barys Nur-Sultan players
Lokomotiv Yaroslavl players
Kazakhstani ice hockey centres
People from Temirtau
Asian Games gold medalists for Kazakhstan
Medalists at the 2017 Asian Winter Games
Asian Games medalists in ice hockey
Ice hockey players at the 2017 Asian Winter Games